The Miss Universo Italia 2004 pageant was held on March 14, 2004. The chosen winner represented Italy at the Miss Universe 2004 .

Results
Miss Universo Italia 2004 : Laia Manetti

External links
 http://missuniverse.notizie.alice.it/index.html?pmk=notmuinav

Miss Universo Italia
2004 beauty pageants
2004 in Italy